People's Press, commonly known as People's Publishing House, abbreviated as PPH, is a China's state-run comprehensive publishing house based in Beijing, which mainly publishes books on philosophy and social sciences, and is the official publisher of political and ideological books for the Chinese Communist Party and the Chinese Government. It is run by the Central Propaganda Department of the Chinese Communist Party. Its important publications include classic works of Marxism, and works by "Leaders of the Party and State" of the People's Republic of China.

History 
People's Publishing House was originally established 1 September 1921, and was rebuilt on 1 December 1950.

In 1986, Ge Jianxiong's dissertation, Population Geography of the Western Han Dynasty, was published as a monograph by the People's Publishing House, which was the first doctoral thesis of history published in the People's Republic of China.

Publications

Works of Leaders of the Party and the State 

 Quotations from Chairman Mao Tse-tung
 General Secretary Xi Jinping important speech series

References

External links 

 

Book publishing companies of China
Publishing organizations
1921 establishments in China
Chinese propaganda organisations